Garrison Tubbs (born February 17, 2002) is an American soccer player who plays for the Wake Forest Demon Deacons in the NCAA Division I.

Club career

Collegiate 
Following the conclusion of the 2020 season, Tubbs was named a freshman (first year) All-American by TopDrawer Soccer, for being one of the top first year college soccer players in the United States.

Senior 
On July 27, 2019, Tubbs appeared for Atlanta United 2, the USL Championship affiliate of Atlanta United, as a 71st-minute substitute in a 4–2 loss to North Carolina FC.

References

External links

 Wake Forest bio

2002 births
Living people
American soccer players
Association football defenders
Atlanta United 2 players
Soccer players from Jacksonville, Florida
USL Championship players
Wake Forest Demon Deacons men's soccer players